Tibor Debreceni (born 19 September 1946) is a Hungarian former cyclist. He competed in the individual road race and team time trial events at the 1972 Summer Olympics.

References

External links
 

1946 births
Living people
Hungarian male cyclists
Olympic cyclists of Hungary
Cyclists at the 1972 Summer Olympics
Cyclists from Budapest
20th-century Hungarian people